The 2020 United States presidential election in Ohio was held on Tuesday, November 3, 2020, as part of the 2020 United States presidential election in which all 50 states plus the District of Columbia participated. Ohio voters chose electors to represent them in the Electoral College via a popular vote, pitting the Republican Party's nominee—incumbent President Donald Trump and his running mate, Vice President Mike Pence—against the Democratic Party nominee, former Vice President Joe Biden and his running mate, California Senator Kamala Harris. Ohio had 18 electoral votes in the Electoral College.

Trump won Ohio with 53.27% of the vote, while Biden received 45.24% of the vote, a margin of 8.03%. Trump won by nearly the same margin that he defeated Hillary Clinton by in 2016. This marked the first time that Ohio voted for the losing candidate and against the winning non-incumbent since 1960, breaking a streak of the state voting for 14 consecutive winning candidates that began in 1964 with LBJ. This is the second consecutive election in which the state voted over 10 points to the right of the nation as a whole, confirming the state's trend towards the Republicans. Biden became the first Democrat since FDR in 1932 to win the White House without carrying the heavily unionized carmaking counties of Mahoning and Trumbull, the first Democrat since Harry Truman in 1948 to win the White House without carrying Lorain County, and the first Democrat since JFK in 1960 to win the White House without Ashtabula and Ottawa counties. This is the first time since 1976 in which Ohio voted to the right of Texas - a state that last voted Democratic that year, while Ohio backed Barack Obama in both of his elections. Also, this is the first time since 1892 that an incumbent president carried the state while losing reelection nationally. Trump won 81 of Ohio's 88 counties compared to 80 in 2016, the most since Ronald Reagan won 82 in 1984.

Primary elections
The primary elections were originally scheduled for March 17, 2020. However, on March 16, Ohio governor Mike DeWine recommended moving the primaries to June amid concerns over the COVID-19 pandemic. As the governor does not have the power to unilaterally make this decision, he went to court to request the delay. However, a judge rejected the lawsuit. Later in the day, the state's Health Director ordered the polls closed as a health emergency. On March 17, the Ohio Supreme Court allowed the primaries to be postponed to June 2. Then on March 25, in-person voting was canceled, and the deadline for mail-in voting was moved back to April 28.

Republican primary
Incumbent President Donald Trump ran unopposed in the Republican primary, and thus received all of Ohio's 82 delegates to the 2020 Republican National Convention.

Democratic primary

General election

Final predictions

Polling
Graphical summary

Aggregate polls

June 1, 2020 – October 31, 2020

January 1, 2020 – May 31, 2020

January 1, 2018 – December 31, 2019

Donald Trump vs. Cory Booker

Donald Trump vs. Pete Buttigieg

Donald Trump vs. Kamala Harris

Donald Trump vs. Bernie Sanders

Donald Trump vs. Elizabeth Warren

with Donald Trump and Sherrod Brown

with Mike Pence and Joe Biden

with Mike Pence and Bernie Sanders

with Mike Pence and Elizabeth Warren

with Donald Trump and Generic Democrat

with John Kasich and Generic Democrat

Results

By county

Counties that flipped from Democratic to Republican 
 Lorain (largest municipality: Lorain)
 Mahoning (largest municipality: Youngstown)

Counties that flipped from Republican to Democratic 
 Montgomery (largest municipality: Dayton)

By congressional district 
Trump won 12 out of the 16 congressional districts in Ohio.

Analysis
Ohio, a Midwestern U.S. state, has been considered one of the most competitive states in said region in the early 21st century. For example, it was a vital tipping-point state in the heavily contested 2004 election, and its projection in 2012 put Barack Obama over the top in the Electoral College. After Trump won Ohio in 2016 by an unexpectedly large margin of 8 points, it was initially considered out of reach for Democrats. However, Democrats contested it after polling pointed to a possibly close result in 2020. 

From 1964 through 2016, the Buckeye State had been a reliable bellwether, voting for the winner of every presidential election. In 2016, however, it voted over ten points to the right of the nation as a whole, indicating that it might be on the cusp of losing its bellwether status. And, indeed, in 2020, Ohio backed the losing nominee for the first time since it backed Richard Nixon in 1960, and, in doing so, voted over ten points to the right of the nation overall for the second time in a row, giving Trump a comfortable eight-point margin even as he lost nationally. This indicated that Ohio is likely following a similar path to that of Missouri, another former bellwether state in the Midwest that has more recently become reliably red. (Missouri voted for the winning candidate in every election from 1960 to 2004. Then, in 2008, it narrowly backed Republican John McCain despite the fact that he lost the election by a wide margin nationally, and in every election since it has voted Republican by a comfortable margin.) In this election, Ohio weighed in at 12.5% more Republican than the nation as a whole, even voting more Republican than Texas, a Southern state that has been a GOP stronghold for four decades.

While Biden outperformed Hillary Clinton in the Midwest at large, Trump managed to flip two Ohio counties Republican: Lorain, a suburban county of Cleveland, and Mahoning, anchored by the car-making town of Youngstown. Trump became the first Republican presidential candidate to win Lorain County since Ronald Reagan in 1984, and the first to win Mahoning County since Richard Nixon in 1972. Biden became the first Democrat since FDR in 1932 to win the White House without carrying Mahoning County and Trumbull County, and the first Democrat since Harry Truman in 1948 to win the White House without carrying Lorain County. On the other hand, Biden won back Montgomery County, home to Dayton, a county which Trump flipped in 2016. He also came within 7 points of flipping suburban Delaware County in the Columbus area, the closest a Democrat has come to flipping it since 1964. 

Biden's results were an all time-best for Democrats in two counties - Franklin, home to the state capital of Columbus, where he received 64.68% of the vote and beat Trump by 31 points, and Hamilton, home to Cincinnati, where he received 57.15% of the vote and beat Trump by 16 points—even greater than Franklin D. Roosevelt's and Lyndon B. Johnson's landslides. Biden's Delaware County result of 45.69% was a 56-year best, and in Warren County of suburban Cincinnati, his result was a 44-year best. He also outperformed Obama's 2012 results in Butler (Cincinnati suburbs) and Greene (Dayton suburbs) counties. 

However, in all other counties, Biden underperformed Barack Obama's 2008 and 2012 results and occasionally also John Kerry's 2004 results. For example, in Athens County, home to Ohio University, which has been one of the Democrats' strongest counties that Obama won by 35 points in both 2008 and 2012, Biden improved Clinton's result by 1.5 percent, but Trump reduced his 2016 losing margin from 17 points to 15 points and managed to win 40% of the county's vote, the first Republican to do so since George H. W. Bush in 1988. Biden underperformed Clinton in the Northeast and Lake Erie area, also in the most populous counties - in addition to losing Mahoning and Lorain counties, although in Cuyahoga County, home to Cleveland, he improved Clinton's 2016 result by 1 point, his 34-point winning margin was one point worse than Clinton's, six points down from Obama's 2012 40-point and only 0.36 percent better than Kerry's in 2004. In Lucas County, home to Toledo, he improved Clinton's result by 1.5 percent, but at a 1 percent worse margin at 16.73%, a 32-year low for Democrats after Michael Dukakis won it by under 9 points in 1988. While in Summit County, home to Akron, he improved Clinton's result by 2.35 percent and the margin by 1 percent, at 9.5 percent it was still a far cry from Obama's 17-percent margin in 2008, and second-worst for Democrats since 1988. In Stark County, home to Canton, he improved Clinton's result by 1.25 percent, but his 1.35% worse losing margin of 18.51 percent was a 36-year low for Democrats, after Walter Mondale lost it by 20.18 percent in 1984. 

This was the first presidential election in which a candidate received more than 3 million votes in Ohio.

Ohio is one of three states—the others being Iowa and Florida—that voted twice for Barack Obama and twice for Donald Trump.

Mahoning County 

Mahoning County, anchored by the car-making town of Youngstown, voted Republican for the first time since Richard Nixon's landslide re-election in 1972. The slim victory by Trump marked a collapse in Democrats' support among white working-class voters, and tightened Trump's grip on blue-collar white voters. 

David Betras, who was Democratic chairman of Mahoning County until 2019, speculated on the disconnect between Democrats in Washington who focused messaging Trump's unfitness for office, his taxes and possible impeachment, and the concerns of blue-collar workers were supporting Trump for his trade war with China, regardless of economic pain caused by tariffs.

See also
 United States presidential elections in Ohio
 2020 Ohio elections
 2020 United States presidential election
 2020 Democratic Party presidential primaries
 2020 Republican Party presidential primaries
 2020 United States elections
 2020 United States presidential election results by state

Notes

Partisan clients

References

Further reading
 . (Describes bellwether Wood County, Ohio)

External links
Elections & Voting  at the Ohio Secretary of State official website

 
 
  (State affiliate of the U.S. League of Women Voters)

Ohio
2020
Presidential